This is a list of mayors of Les Planches, Switzerland. Les Planches is a former municipality of the canton of Vaud. From 1953, its name was "Montreux-Planches". It merged in 1962 with Montreux-Châtelard to form Montreux. 

For later mayors, see:
List of mayors of Montreux

Montreux
Planches
 
Lists of mayors (complete 1900-2013)